Chaim Goldberg (March 20, 1917 – June 26, 2004) was a Polish-American artist, painter, sculptor, and engraver. He is known for being a chronicler of Jewish life in the eastern European Polish villages (or shtetlekh) like the one in his native Kazimierz Dolny in eastern Poland. He witnessed life and the recurring art colony atmosphere that he yearned for himself, and later undertook the mission of being a leading painter of Holocaust-era art, which to the artist was seen as an obligation and art with a sense of profound mission.

Following World War II he emigrated to Israel and in 1967 to the United States. He and his family became US citizens in 1973. He died in Boca Raton, Florida in 2004.

Early life
Chaim Goldberg was born in a wooden clapboard house built by his father, a village cobbler. The house stood on Blotna Street as it was called at the time due to the fact that the creek would overflow and the road turned to a muddy area. As a young boy of 6 he gravitated to creating little figurines carved from stones which he gave away to his friends. Later he took up drawing and painting with basic shoemaker paints that he found at his father's workbench. He was the ninth child and the first boy after eight girls. He grew up in a religious home in Kazimierz Dolny.  He would observe and draw the beggars and klezmers who frequented his home as guests. His father would encourage their stays by letting it be known that the humble Goldberg home was open for those who could not pay for their night stay at any of the inns. They were surely welcome there. These characters became Chaim's early models.

Discovery & The Artist's First Shtetl period

On a crisp day in the fall of 1931, Dr. Saul Silberstein, a student of Sigmund Freud who was doing post doctorate work on his book, Jewish Village Mannerisms came into the Goldberg cobbler workshop to have his shoes repaired.  As he waited for his shoes, he noticed the numerous art works that were attached to the wall with shoe nails and inquired who the artist was.  

Silberstein spent the entire night reviewing the young artist’s work. In the morning they went by foot to Lublin, a distance of 26 miles and Dr. Silberstein obtained the opinions of several respected individuals of the work by Chaim Goldberg. He then got him several small scholarships based on these letters of recommendation. This helped finance his early education at the "Józef Mehoffer School for Fine Arts", in Kraków, from which he graduated in 1934. 

Dr. Silberstein was able to interest several other wealthy sponsors, such as the honorable Felix Kronstein, a judge, and a newspaper publisher who supported the artist through his graduation from the Academy of Fine Arts in Warsaw.

The beauty of Kazimierz Dolny had long ago been discovered by artists who had flocked there in large numbers over the years. Between the First World War and the Second World War, Kazimierz Dolny became known as an Art Colony as well. Prof. Tadeusz Pruszkowski had built a summer studio in the mountains and attracted his students to come down and paint outdoors. many of these artists as well as older ones painted the life they saw and the landscape.

Chaim Goldberg became stimulated by this traffic of artists and began to do art as well. When he was discovered he had not attended any school or private lessons. He watched what the other artists did and was encouraged to do the same; set himself up with a home-made easel and paint outdoors. When he was discovered at the age of 14, his collection included landscapes as well as paintings of the vagabond types that frequented his home as guests.

The War Years 1939-1945

Chaim was conscripted into the Polish army in the fall of 1938. He was assigned to the artillery brigade that guarded Warsaw. After the Polish army surrendered to the Germans he was taken into custody as a POW (Prisoner of War) and held in a labor camp. He managed to escape and tried to rescue his parents and family who would not believe that the Germans had any intention of hurting the Jews. He could not motivate them to flee with him. 

So Chaim, his future wife, her sister and their parents became exiles escaping to Russia on foot. They kept moving north as the German armies advanced and ended up in Novosibirsk. Chaim married Rachel on April 15, 1944. They were able to return to Poland in 1946.

Emigration
Chaim Goldberg received a fellowship from the Polish Ministry of Culture to study at the Ecole de beaux Arts in Paris and in 1949 they returned to Poland. He worked on various commissions for the Polish Government and in 1955 made an application to be allowed to immigrate to Israel.

The Goldberg family arrived in Israel in 1955 and began a new life. They stayed in Israel until 1967 where Chaim exhibited and sold his work to American, Canadian tourists and Israeli collectors. Despite that Safed (near Tiberias) was the art colony of record, Chaim Goldberg's presence in northern Tel Aviv became a well known bit of art trivia to almost everyone and his studio drew from the wealthier tourists who frequented Hotel Ramat Aviv.

The Artist's Second Shtetl Period
Once ensconced in his large studio, Chaim Goldberg began to create large paintings that depicted Jewish life he remembered in his Shtetl of Kazimierz Dolny. During this period, of 1960-1966 he created some of his best known paintings, such as The Wedding (in the collection of the Spertus Museum, Chicago); The Shtetl (in the collection of the Metropolitan Museum of Art, NY);, Simchat Torah (in a private collection, NY); and Don't Forget.

Sculptures

Chaim Goldberg's insatiable desire to create art in many mediums knew no end. He engraved and sculpted in wood, stone, and metal. Here we see a 9 1/2 foot tall carving from oak, titled WE. He would stain his sculptures in various tones and have editions of 8 bronzes cast of each one he chose for editioning. His main advisor was his wife of 65 years, Rachel.

The United States
In 1967, Goldberg arrived in the United States, with a two-year business visa on an exhibition-tour and continued to paint, and create line engravings of his village characters, as well as sculpt. His and subject matter widened while living in New York which became one of his "themes." He and his family decided to become citizens of the United States in 1973.

Influences
Goldberg's "Culture Shock" series and other series based on real life and politics of the period as were the works of the series the "Mad Drivers." Some of his work dealt with his own dream sequences, such as the "Violin Thief Sequence" and the "Bird Dream Sequence".

In 1974, Chaim attended a performance of Emmett Kelly, Jr.'s circus and began a series of drawings and other works on paper inspired by the circus theme. Then dance took center stage as his main subject. He also carved in wood. His body of work on the dance theme included paintings, watercolors, and sculpture carved in wood or made of aggregate concrete. Goldberg continued line engraving and created a suite of 6 engravings titled, "Spring". 

In video taped interviews with the artist's son, Shalom, it becomes clear that Chaim Goldberg's career took two parallel paths of creation by virtue of his ability to compartmentalize his time and to the success of his Judaic theme to support him and his family throughout his life.

Holocaust theme

In 1944 while in exile in Russia, Goldberg began making an effort to document what he heard. He returned to Poland with his wife and son, Victor, and began to create over 150 works of art dealing with the Holocaust, many of which are in the permanent collection of several museums, namely the Spertus Institute for Jewish Learning and Leadership in Chicago.

Third Shtetl Period

In 1987, while working on the Holocaust theme, Goldberg returned to painting his beloved Kazimierz Dolny and the Jewish life in the village. This time his paintings were less lyrical and surreal, and instead were more 'story-telling' and documentary. After completing some fifty large canvases in 1997, at the age of 80, he was diagnosed with a disabling illness. He died on June 26, 2004 in Boca Raton, Florida, aged 87.

Exhibitions
1931 - "Polish Landscapes," Group Show, Kazimierz-Dolny, Poland
1934 - Studio Show, Kazmierz-Dolny, Poland
1936 - National Group Show, Warsaw, Poland
1937 - National Group Show, Warsaw, Poland (the artist, his future wife and her family were refugees in Siberia)
1946 - "Poland After World War II" solo show, Shtczechin, Poland
1947 - National Group Show, Warsaw, Poland
1949 - National Group Show, Warsaw, Poland
1950 - National Group Show, Warsaw, Poland
1951 - National Group Show, Warsaw, Poland
1952 - National Group Show, Warsaw, Poland
1965 - One Man Show, Pioneer House, Giv'atayim, Israel
1966 - Retrospective Show, Museum Yad Labanim, Petach Tikvah, Israel (attended by Mrs. Golda Meir - Prime Minister; and Kadish Luz - Speaker of the House (Knesset)
1967 - One Man Show, LYS Gallery, New York
1968 - One Man Show, Theodor Hertzl Institute, New York City, New York
1968 - One Man Show, Mixed Media Art Center, Syracuse, New York
1969 - One Man Show, Paul Kessler Art Gallery, Provincetown, Massachusetts
1970 - One Man Show, Paul Kessler Art Gallery, Provincetown, Massachusetts
1971 - Large Retrospective Exhibit at the DeAndries Gallery, St' John's University, Queens, New York
1972 - One Man Show, Mixed Media, Lincoln Mall Art Center, Miami, Florida
1972 - Group Show, Mixed Media, American Congress, Washington, D.C.
1973 - One Man Show, "Chaim Goldberg's Shtetl" (drawings, watercolors, sculptures, oil paintings and line engravings) Smithsonian Institution, Hall of Graphic Arts, Washington, D. C.
1973 - Group Exhibit, "Jewish Motifs and Culture of the 20th Century," Klingspor Museum, Offenbach, Germany
1974 - One Man Show, The Avila Art Center, Jewish Synagogue, Caracas, Venezuela
1977 - Group Show with the Texas Society of Sculptors, Houston Public Library, Main Branch, Houston, Texas
1979 - One Man Show, Museum of Printing History, Houston, Texas
1982 - Group Exhibit, "Art of the Twentieth Century - A Revelation," Congregation Beth Israel, Houston, Texas
1985 - Group Exhibit, "Twenty-Sixth Invitational," Longview Museum of Art, Longview, Texas
1994 - Group Exhibit, "Shtetl Life," the Nathan and Faye Hurvitz Collection, the Magnes Collection of Jewish Art and Life, Berkeley, California Goldberg's "Marketplace", a hand-colored litho was on the cover of the exhibit catalog.
1997 - One Man Exhibit, "Chaim Goldberg at 80," Nathan B. Rosen Museum, Adolph & Rose Levis Jewish Community Center, Boca Raton, Florida
1997 - One Man Exhibit, "Remembering the Shtetl - 75 Years of the Art of Chaim Goldberg," Texas Union Art gallery, University of Texas at Austin
2002 - One Man Exhibit, "Oil Paintings of the Shtetl," Shir Art Gallery, Southfield, Michigan
2003 - One Man Exhibit, "Landscapes and Observations," Shir Art Gallery, Southfield, Michigan
2004 - One Man Exhibit, "Engravings and Lithos," Shir Art Gallery, Southfield, Michigan
2009 - Group Exhibition, "Jewish Interwar Painters of Kazimierz Dolny," Poland, Rapperswil Castle by Lake Zurich, Switzerland
2009 - One Man Exhibit "Remembering the Shtetl," National Bottle Museum, Balston Spa, New York
2013 - One Man Show of over 160 drawings, watercolors and oil paintings from 1946 to 2000, "Chaim Goldberg Returns to Kazimierz Dolny," from 09.12.2013  to 31.08.2014 Muzeum Nadwiślański, Kazimierz Dolny, Poland
2015 - One Man Show of drawings and paintings KAMIENICA CELEJOWSKA / 11 grudnia 2015 – 3 kwietnia 2016  Muzeum Nadwiślański, Kazimierz Dolny, Poland
2016 - One Man Show of 75 drawings, watercolors and paintings Museum, I Remember, Kraków, Poland / May 8 - July 28
2016 - One Man Show "I Remember The Shtetl" of 100 themed oil paintings, watercolors, drawings, plus 30 of his graphics; works in such mediums as engravings, etchings and wood engravings, at the Palace of Art in Kraków, September 15 - October 9

Collections

 Metropolitan Museum of Art, 20th Century Permanent Art Collection, New York City, New York
 Museum of Modern Art, New York City, New York
 Beit HaNassi, Jerusalem, Israel
 Yad Vashem, Jerusalem, Israel
 Jerusalem Municipality, Jerusalem, Israel
 Museum Yad Labanim, Petach Tikvah, Israel
 Musée du Petit Palais, Geneva, Switzerland
 National Museum, Warsaw, Poland
 Jewish Museum, Warsaw, Poland
 Klingspor Museum, Offenbach, Germany
 National Gallery of Art, Lessing Rosenwald Collection Washington, D.C.
 National Gallery of Art, Washington, D.C.
 Smithsonian Institution, American Art Museum and Renwick Gallery Collection, Washington, D.C.
 Philadelphia Museum of Art, Philadelphia, Pennsylvania
 Lowe Art Museum, Miami, Florida
 Museum of Fine Arts, Boston, Massachusetts
 Yale University Art Gallery, New Haven, Connecticut
 Sylvia Plotkin Judaica Museum, Phoenix, Arizona
 Public Library Art Collection, San Francisco, California
 New York Public Library, New York City, New York
 Wadsworth Atheneum, Hartford, Connecticut
 Springfield Museum of Art, Springfield, Massachusetts
 Museum of Fine Arts Houston, Houston, Texas
 Houston Public Library, Houston, Texas
 Spertus Institute for Jewish Learning and Leadership, Chicago, Illinois
 Judah L. Magnes Museum, Berkeley, California
 Skirball Museum, Los Angeles, California
 Yeshiva University Museum, New York City, New York
 YIVO, New York City, New York
 Jewish Theological Seminary, Cincinnati, Ohio
 Derfner Judaica Museum, in the Jacob Reingold Pavilion, Riverdale, NY
 POLIN, Warsaw, Poland
 Muzeum Nadwiślański, Kazimierz Dolny, Poland

List of Kazimierz-Dolny artists
The artists who frequented the Kazimierz-Dolny Art Colony were many, some of the Jewish artists were:
 Maurycy (Mosze) Applebaum (1886-1931)
 Eugeniusz Act (1899-1974)
 Jozef Badower (1910-1941)
 Henryk (Henoch) Barcinski (1896-1939)
 Adolph Behrman (1876-1942)
 Henryk Berlewi (1894-1967)
 Salomon (Szulim) Bialogorski (1900-1942)
 Arnold Blaufuks (1894-1943)
 Sasza (Szaje) Blonder (1909-1949)
 Icchak Wincenty Brauner (1887-1944)
 Aniela Cukier (1900-1944)
 Bencion Cukierman (1890-1944)
 Samuel Cygler (1898-1943)
 Herszel Cyna (1911-1942)
 Henryk (Chaim) Cytryn (1911-1943)
 Jakub Cytryn (1909-1943)
 Rachel Diament (1920-2003)
 Boas Dulman (1900-1942)
 Samuel Finkelstein (1890-1943)
 Abraham Frydman (1906-1941)
 Feliks Frydman (1897-1942)
 Jozef Mojzesz Gabowicz (1862-1939)
 Izydor Goldhuber-Czaj (1896-1942)
 Dawid (Dionizy) Grieffenberg (1909-1942)
 Michal Grusz (1911-1943)
 Izaak Grycendler (1908-1944)
 Chaim Hanft (1899-1951)
 Adam Herszaft (1886-1942)
 Elzbieta Hirszberzanka (1899-1942)
 Ignacy Hirszfang (1903-1943)
 Gizela Hufnagel (1903-1997)
 Marcin Kitz (1891-1943)
 Natan Korzen (1895-1941)
 Jozef Kowner (1895-1967)
 Szymon Kratka (1884-1960)
 Izaak Krzeczanowski (1910-1941)
 Chaim Lajzer (1893-1942)
 Natalia Landau (1907-1943)
 Henryk Lewensztadt (1893-1962)
 Mary Litauer (Schneiderowa) (1900-1942)
 Jozef Majzels (1911-1943)
 Arieh Merzer (1910–1974)
 Stella Amelia Miller (1910- ? )
 Maurycy Minkowski (1881-1930)
 Abraham Neuman (1873-1942)
 Szlomo Nussbaum (1906-1946)
 Abraham Ostrzega (1889-1942)
 Samuel Puterman (1901-1955)
 Henryk Rabinowicz (1890-1942)
 Stanislawa Reicher (1889-1943)
 Bernard Rolnicki (1885-1942)
 Roman Rozental (1897-1962)
 Mojzesz Rynecki (1885-1942)
 The Seidenbeutel brothers:
 Efraiim Seidenbeutel (1902-1945)
 Jozef Seidenbeutel (1894-1923)
 Menashe Seidenbeutel (1902-1945)
 Efraiim  & Gela Seksztajn(1907-1943)
 Marcel Słodki (1892-1943)
 Arieh Sperski (1902-1943)
 Marek Szapiro (1884-1942)
 Natan Spigel (1900-1942)
 Jozef Tom (1886-1962)
 Feliks Topolski (1907-1989)
 Symcha Trachtner (1893-1942)
 Maurycy Trębacz (1861-1941)
 Tadeusz Trebacz (1910-1945)
 Izrael Tykocinski (1895-1942)
 Jakub Weinles (1870-1938)
 Wladyslaw Weintraub (Chaim Wof) (1891-1942)
 Israel Szmuel (Szmul) Wodnicki (1901-1971)
 Pinkus Zelman (1907-1936)
 Izaak Zajdler (1905-1943)
 Leon Zysberg (1901-1942)
 Fiszel Zylberberg (1909-1942).

Notes

References and Sources (Books and Exhibit Catalogs)
 
      Darmon, Adrian  Around Jewish Art: A Dictionary of Painters, Sculptors and   Photographers,  Carnot Press, April 2004, 
      Brody, Moskowitz-, Cynthia -Bittersweet Legacy, Creative Responses to the Holocaust, University Press of America, Inc. Lanham, Maryland 20706 (Pages 268-269)
      Dr. Waldemar Odorowski; Dorota Święcicka-Odorowska; Dorota Seweryn-Puchalska; Stanisław Święcicki; Jarosław Moździoch, In Kazimierz the Vistula River spoke to them in Yiddish, Published by the Muzeum Nadwiślańskie, Kazimierz Dolny, Poland, 2007.
      Del Calzo, Nick, Rockford, Renee, Raper J., Linda – The Triumphant Spirit, published by the Triumphant Spirit Foundation, 1997. 
      Helzel Florence, B., Shtetl life: the Nathan and Faye Hurvitz Collection, Judah L. Magnes Museum, 1993
      Queens Council for the Arts, Chaim Goldberg: Israeli Artist, 1971
      Goldberg, Shalom, Chaim Goldberg: My Shtetl Kazimierz Dolny, SHIR Press, 2007
      Harris, Elizabeth, Chaim Goldberg's Shtetl, exhibit catalog published by the Smithsonian Institution, Washington, D.C., 1973.
      Lubieniecki, Krzysztof, Polish Engravers, by General Books LLC, 1983
      Chaim Goldberg. Powrót do Kazimierza nad Wisłą / Chaim Goldberg. Kazimierz Revisited. Editor and Contributor Dr. Waldemar Odorowski, published by Muzeum Nadwiślańskie w Kazimierzu Dolnym - December, 2013 

Brief description of the publication by the Museum:  "
Katalog wystawy o tym samym tytule, która prezentowana jest w nowej siedzibie Muzeum Nadwiślańskiego w Kazimierzy Dolnym. Wydawnictwo prezentuje życie i twórczość Chaima Goldberga, który urodził się w Kazimierzu w 1917 roku w biednej rodzinie tutejszego szewca. Dzięki odkryciu jego talentu przez dr. Saula Silbersteina i udzieleniu wsparcia finansowego młody artysta miał szansę studiować w prywatnej Szkole L. Mehofferowej w Krakowie, a nastepnie w Akademii Sztuk Pięknych w Warszawie. Tutaj trafił pod skrzydła prof. Tadeusza Pruszkowskiego, który był nota bene twórcą kazimierskiej kolonii artystycznej. Los sprawił, że Chaim po ucieczce przed Zagładą nigdy do Kazimierza już nie wrócił, ale miasteczko ciągle było obecne w jego twórczości. Obrazy kronikarza kazimierskiego sztetla pokazują zarówno życie codzienne jego mieszkańców, jak i dni świąteczne. To niezwykła opowieść o świecie, który odszedł na zawsze.
Katalog wzbogacają eseje specjalistów, w tym syna artysty Shaloma Goldberga."

Bibliography of Articles
 Aloisio, Julie, "Chaim Goldberg's Art Celebrates Life," The Villager, 1988, Miami, Florida
 Alyagon, Ofra, "Chaim Goldberg The Artist," (Life and Problems, July 1966, Paris, France
 Amazallag, Giselle, "A Visit with the Artist Chaim Goldberg," Dimensions Magazine, February/March 1997, Boca Raton, Florida
 Avidar, Tamar, "Chaim Goldberg Does Not Forget," (Davar Hashavua, 1965, Tel Aviv, Israel
 Chir, Myriam, "Chaim Goldberg - Painter and Sculptor," (L'information D'Israel, Feb. 1965, Tel Aviv, Israel
 Diamonstein, Barbara, "Chaim Goldberg - From Exile to Genius," Art & Antiques Magazine, June, 2002, USA
 Dolbin, B.F., "Chaim Goldberg - The Sholom Aleichem of the Arts," Autlan, July, 1967, New York, NY
 Dluznowski-Dunow, M., "Important Exhibit of Chaim Goldberg," The Forward, 1967, New York, NY
 Dluznowski-Dunow, M., "The Painter and Sculptor Chaim Goldberg," Culture and Life, Polish language publication, 1967, New York, NY.
 Evremond-Saint, "Chaim Goldberg," Le Courier des Arts, June 29, 1967, New York, NY
 Frank, M., "Chaim Goldberg in the Smithsonian National Museum," The Forward, April, 1973, New York, NY
 Friedman, Sousanna, "A Visit with Chaim Goldberg," The Bulletin - American Jewish Libraries, 1978
 Kantz, Shimon, "The Artist Chaim Goldberg," Yiddishe Shriftin, Oct., 1954, Warsaw, Poland
 Hall, D., "Goldberg at the Caravan," Park East Nov. 1st, 1973, New York, NY
 Kiel, C., "The Dynamic Jewish Artist Chaim Goldberg," The Forward, 1987, New York, NY
 Luden, Itzchak, "Chaim Goldberg in the Smithsonian National Museum," The Forward, April 1973, New York, NY
 Massney, P., "Proud Moment," The Long Island Press, March 31, 1971, NY
 Paris, J., "Chaim Goldberg to Exhibit Art," The Long Island Press, March 28, 1971, NY
 Paris, J., "Exhibit Aides Council Reach a Goal," The Long Island Press, April 5, 1971, NY
 Robak, Kazimierz, "I Left My Heart There," Gazeta Antykwaryczna, Part 1 of 3, October 2000, Kraków, Poland
 Robak, Kazimierz, "I Left My Heart There," Gazeta Antykwaryczna, Part 2 of 3, November 2000, Kraków, Poland
 Robak, Kazimierz, "I Left My Heart There," Gazeta Antykwaryczna, Part 3 of 3, December 2000, Kraków, Poland
 Robak, Kazimierz, "Kuzmir in Chaim Goldberg’s painting," Spotkania z Zabytkami, Vol. 3 (253), March 2008. 12-15. Warsaw, Poland
 Rogers, M., "Goldberg Pursues New Directions," Houston Chronicle, Oct. 12th, 1977, Houston, TX
 Samuels, J., "An Artist and His Wife," (Jewish Herald-Voice, March, 1978, Houston, TX)
 Samsot-Hawk, Kathleen, "Chaim Goldberg," (Art Voices, November/December 1977)
 Scott, Paul, "Chaim Goldberg: An Artist Reborn," (Southwest Art Magazine, July/August 1975, Houston, TX)
 Shirey, david, "Chaim Goldberg's Art Shown in Queens," (New York Times, March, 19th 1971, NY)
 Shmulevitz, I., "The Exhibit of the Artist Chaim Goldberg," (The Forward, March 13, 1971, NY)
 Shneiderman, Emil, "The Art of Chaim Goldberg," (The Day Journal, July 2, 1967, New York, NY)
 Shneiderman, Emil, "Chaim Goldberg's Art on Exhibit in Queens," (The Day Journal, March 14, 1971, New York, NY)
 Staingart, T., "An Exhibition of Paintings by Chaim Goldberg," (The Forward, 1967, New York, NY)
 Taube, H., "The Lost World Recaptured in Art," (The Baltimore Jewish Times, April 1973, Baltimore, MD)
 Tennenbaum, Shea, "Chaim Goldberg, The Artist From Kazimierz-Dolny," (The Voice, October 10, 1967, New York, NY)
 Tennenbaum, Shea, "Chaim Goldberg's Jews Live Forever," (The Voice, October 1967, Paris, France)
 The Forward, "Chaim Goldberg's Art Exhibited at the Hertzel Institute," (The Forward, April 12, 1968, New York, NY)
 The Forward, "Leivik House in Tel Aviv Receives Gift from Acknowledged Artist Chaim Goldberg," (The Forward, April 12, 1970, New York, NY)
 The Buffalo Jewish Review, "The Artist Goldberg Exhibits," (December 6, 1970, Buffalo, NY)
 The Houston Chronicle, "Central Library to Unveil A New Goldberg Sculpture," (October 31, 1980, Houston, TX)
 Waisman, Gavriel, "The Artist Chaim Goldberg," (The Day, May 1966, Tel Aviv, Israel)
 Waisman, Gavriel, "The Artist Chaim Goldberg," (Life and Problems, July 1966, Paris, France)
 Zonshain, Jacob, "The Prolific Artist," (Folkshtime, November 15, 1949, Warsaw Poland)

Catalogues Raisonné Series
Vol. #1 - Chaim Goldberg’s Shtetl: The Drawings, series name: The Complete Works of Chaim Goldberg, by Shalom Goldberg, Bayglow Press, January 2015, 

Vol. #9 - Chaim Goldberg’s Dance, series name: The Complete Works of Chaim Goldberg, by Shalom Goldberg, Bayglow Press, January 2015

Vol. #10 - Chaim Goldberg’s Israeli Landscapes, series name: The Complete Works of Chaim Goldberg, by Shalom Goldberg, Bayglow Press, December 2014, 

Vol. #11 - Chaim Goldberg’s American Landscapes and Florals, series name: The Complete Works of Chaim Goldberg, by Shalom Goldberg, Bayglow Press, December 2014,

Illustrated Books
	Friedlander, Albert, Out of the Whirlwind, UAHC Press, 1999. 
       Roseman, Kenneth, "Until the Messiah Comes", Do It Yourself Jewish Adventure Series,   - Front cover illustration, detail from his painting titled, Marketplace.
	Shnayderman, Shemu’el-Leyb, The River Remembers, AAH Publishers, 1970, OCLC Number: 19302464, Translated into English as The River Remembers, (New York : Horizon Press, 1978

Limited Edition Portfolios
      "Chaim Goldberg's Shtetl", a portfolio of 10 engravings and intaglio prints (mixed media of etching and some engraving) created earlier as separate editions, published in 1973 to commemorate Chaim Goldberg's One Man Show at the Smithsonian's newly inaugurated Hall of Graphic Arts. Portfolio was published by Shalom Goldberg, the artist's son. It consists of the ten works of art held by a double, folded sheet of same Arches paper, and protective glassine sheet, and two original drawings. The edition size was 10 portfolios with ten impressions each. Each impression was printed by had, by the artist in his New York studio in Queens, using a Rembrandt Etching press. The impressions are done in a variety of ink colors, ranging from Lamp Black, to Cerrulian Blue mixed with Prussian Blue and a variety of Sepia shades. Each edition from which the ten identically numbered sets were pulled, were executed in editions of 200 signed and numbered impressions, thus making the portfolio extremely rare. On top of the rarity by the small set of 10, each portfolio cover sheet includes two original illustrations in pen and ink by Chaim Goldberg.

Included in each portfolio set are the following works:
 Dreamer - Line Engraving
 To the Unknown - Intaglio
 The Blacksmith - Intaglio
 Moving Day - Intaglio
 Two Hasidic Dancers - Etching
 Seven Hasidic Dancers - Etching
 The Cheder - Intaglio
 Duet - Intaglio
 Purim - Intaglio
 The Hora - Intaglio

Further reading
   The official website of the artist Chaim Goldberg 
  Book, "Polish Engravers: Chaim Goldberg, Zofia Albinowska-Minkiewiczowa, Czes?aw S?ania, Raphaėl Kleweta, Józef Hecht, Krzysztof Lubieniecki, published by General Books LLC, 1983 
"The River Remembers, by S. L. Shneiderman, AAH Publishers, 1970, 
 Shtetl life: The Nathan and Faye Hurvitz Collection, by Florence B. Helzel (Author), Essay by Steven J. Zipperstein, Ph.D., published by Judah L. Magnes Museum (1993), 
 Bittersweet Legacy, Creative Responses to the Holocaust, Brody, Moskowitz, Cynthia, University Press of America, Inc. Lanham, Maryland 20706 
 The Triumphant Spirit: Portraits & Stories of Holocaust Survivors Their Messages of Hope & Compassion by Renee Rockford(Author, Editor), Nick Del Calzo (Editor), Linda J. Raper (Editor) 
 Book:  Out of the Whirlwind, by Friedlander, Albert, UAHC Press, 1999. ISBN 0-8074-0703-8
 Book:  In Kazimierz the Vistula River spoke to them in Yiddish...: Jewish painters in the art colony of Kazimierz Dolny, by Dr. Waldemar Odorowski (Author and Editor), published by Muzeum Nadwislanskie, Kazimierz Dolny, Poland 2008
  Book, Chaim Goldberg-Powrót do Kazimierza nad Wisłą / Chaim Goldberg’s Return to Kazimierz,    Editor and Contributor Dr. Waldemar Odorowski, published by Muzeum Nadwiślańskie w Kazimierzu Dolnym - December, 2013 
 Book:  Bezpieczna przystań artysty, by Łukasz Grzejszczak. (available with subscription or purchase). Abraham Adolf Behrman (1876-1942). Stowarzyszenie Historyków Sztuki. Retrieved August 20, 2012.
 Book:  Around Jewish Art: A Dictionary of Painters, Sculptors and Photographers, by Darmon, Adrian, Carnot Press, April 2004, 
 Book:  Modernism in 6 Mediums:...: The Unknown Art of Chaim Goldberg (Artist Discovery Series), by Shalom Goldberg (Author and Editor), published by Amazon KDP, Clearwater, Florida Dec. 2, 2018
 Book:  Chaim Goldberg: Master Engraver... A Catalogue of available graphic work executed between 1960-2000, by Shalom Goldberg (Author and Editor), published by Amazon KDP, Clearwater, Florida June. 9, 2015
 Book:  Chaim Goldberg:... A Modernist Artist With a Mission, An Introduction to a Life's Work Part 1 & 2 by Shalom Goldberg (Author and Editor), published by Amazon KDP, Clearwater, Florida May 30, 2015
 Book:  Modernist Themes, A Catalogue of Varied Modernist Themes by Shalom Goldberg (Author and Editor), published by Amazon KDP, Clearwater, Florida March 22, 2018
 Book:  Chaim Goldberg: The Echoes Never Stop by Shalom Goldberg (Author and Editor), published by Amazon KDP, Clearwater, Florida January 23, 2019
 Book:  Chaim Goldberg: Exploring Modernism Vol 5 by Shalom Goldberg (Author and Editor), published by Amazon KDP, Clearwater, Florida November 16, 2018
 Book:  Chaim Goldberg: Exploring Modernism Vol 3 by Shalom Goldberg (Author and Editor), published by Amazon KDP, Clearwater, Florida October 30, 2018
 Book:  Chaim Goldberg: I Remember the Shtetl by Shalom Goldberg (Author and Editor), published by Alois Rostek, Krakow, Poland January 1, 2016

References
   Article, New York Times, by David Shirey, March 19, 1971 Art & Reviews Sect. Page 28 
 Book:  Out of the Whirlwind, by Friedlander, Albert, COVER: by Chaim Goldberg UAHC Press, 1999.

External links
 Official website dedicated to Chaim Goldberg
  In the Smithsonian Archive
 
 Exhibition titled Chaim Goldberg Returns to Kazimierz Dolny, Muzeum Nadwishlanskie December 9 - 2013 to August 31 -2014.

1917 births
2004 deaths
People from Puławy County
Polish emigrants to Israel
Israeli emigrants to the United States
Jewish painters
Jewish sculptors
Polish engravers
20th-century engravers
21st-century engravers
École des Beaux-Arts alumni
Academy of Fine Arts in Warsaw alumni
20th-century Polish sculptors
Polish male sculptors
20th-century Polish painters
20th-century Polish male artists
Polish male painters
Polish military personnel of World War II
Polish prisoners of war
World War II prisoners of war held by Germany
Escapees from German detention